Sharapovka is a rural locality (a selo) and the administrative center of Sharapovskoye Rural Settlement, Novooskolsky District, Belgorod Oblast, Russia. The population was 907 as of 2010. There are 8 streets.

Geography 
Sharapovka is located 14 km east of Novy Oskol (the district's administrative centre) by road. Mozolevka is the nearest rural locality.

References 

Rural localities in Novooskolsky District